Makói FC is a Hungarian football club located in Makó, Hungary. It currently plays in Hungarian National Championship II. The team's colors are yellow and green.

Football clubs in Hungary
Association football clubs established in 1989
1989 establishments in Hungary